Bhola Nath Silwal (born 4 January 1987 in Biratnagar, Nepal) is a Nepali professional footballer, who plays for Nepal Police Club in the Martyr's Memorial A-Division League as a midfielder. He debuted for Nepal national football team during the 2014 FIFA World Cup qualifiers.

International career 
Silwal scored the tying goal for Nepal in a 1–1 draw with Bangladesh on 20 September 2012.

International goals
Scores and results list Nepal's goal tally first.

Personal life 
On 6 June 2015 Silwal was married with Elyaza Acharya.

References

External links 
 

1987 births
Living people
Sportspeople from Kathmandu
Association football midfielders
Nepalese footballers
Nepal international footballers